Eric Lacroix (born July 15, 1971) is a Canadian former professional ice hockey player. Lacroix played eight seasons in the National Hockey League (NHL) for the Toronto Maple Leafs, Los Angeles Kings, Colorado Avalanche, New York Rangers and Ottawa Senators. He is the son of former Colorado Avalanche president Pierre Lacroix and has worked in various management positions within the Avalanche. He currently is a studio analyst for the Colorado Avalanche on Altitude Sports and Entertainment.

Playing career
Lacroix was selected in the 7th round, 136th overall in the 1990 NHL Entry Draft by the Toronto Maple Leafs. He then played two years of collegiate hockey with St. Lawrence University of the ECAC. Lacroix made his professional debut with Maple Leafs American Hockey League affiliate, the St. John's Maple Leafs before appearing in his first NHL game with the Leafs in the 1993–94 season.

Lacroix enjoyed his most successful stint in the NHL with the Colorado Avalanche, posting a career high 18 goals, 18 assists and 36 points in the 1996–97 season, as the Avalanche fell just short of defending their Stanley Cup title.

On February 13, 1999, Lacroix was traded from the Los Angeles Kings to the Rangers for Sean Pronger. On March 1, 2001, Lacroix was traded from the Rangers to the Senators for Colin Forbes before ending his professional career at 472 NHL games after the conclusion of the 2000–01 season.

Management
Post-retirement, Lacroix remained involved in hockey and returned to the Avalanche organization, assuming the roles of assistant video coach and director of hockey operations for four seasons. He became the co-owner and governor of the Arizona Sundogs of the Central Hockey League. After three years with the Sundogs, helping claim the Ray Miron President's Cup as champions of the CHL, Lacroix joined the Phoenix Coyotes organization for the 2008–09 season as a professional scout.

On June 3, 2009, Lacroix re-joined his father in Colorado, when he was named Vice President of Hockey Operations for the Avalanche. He served in his role for four consecutive seasons, before leaving after the 2012–13 season.

Broadcasting
It was announced on September 18, 2017, that Lacroix had signed on to be a studio analyst for the Vegas Golden Knights on AT&T SportsNet Rocky Mountain.

Career statistics

Awards and honors

See also
List of family relations in the National Hockey League

References

External links

1971 births
Living people
Arizona Coyotes scouts
Canadian ice hockey left wingers
Colorado Avalanche coaches
Colorado Avalanche executives
Colorado Avalanche players
Ice hockey people from Montreal
Los Angeles Kings players
New York Rangers players
Ottawa Senators players
Phoenix Roadrunners (IHL) players
St. John's Maple Leafs players
St. Lawrence Saints men's ice hockey players
Toronto Maple Leafs draft picks
Toronto Maple Leafs players
Vegas Golden Knights announcers
Canadian ice hockey coaches
The Governor's Academy alumni